Chitrangi is a 1964 Indian Tamil-language film, directed by R. S. Mani and produced by T. R. Sundaram of Modern Theatres. The film stars A. V. M. Rajan, Pushpalatha and Sheela. The soundtrack was composed by Vedha, while the lyrics were written by K. M. Balasubramaniam and Vaali.

Plot

Cast 
 A. V. M. Rajan
Pushpalatha
 Sheela
 R. S. Manohar
 A. Karunanidhi
 Kumari Rukmini
 S. V. Ramadas
 Kumari Padmini
 Pushpamala

Soundtrack 
The music was composed by Vedha. Lyrics were written by Ku. Ma. Balasubramaniam and Vaali. One song "Pozhudhu Pularnddhadhu Poo Pole", sung by P. Susheela was composed by K. V. Mahadevan and the lyrics were penned by Kannadasan. The song "Velodu Vilaiyaadum Murugaiyaa" is set to the Carnatic raga Abheri.

Reception 
Film historian Randor Guy noted that, despite the "fast-paced storytelling" and the fact that the film was "sharply edited", it was not a box office success.

References

External links 
 
 

1960s Tamil-language films
1964 films
Films scored by Vedha (composer)